Eupachygaster is a genus of flies in the family Stratiomyidae.

Species
Eupachygaster alexanderi (Brèthes, 1922)
Eupachygaster flava James, 1977
Eupachygaster lasiops Speiser, 1922
Eupachygaster subtarsalis Krivosheina, 2004
Eupachygaster tarsalis (Zetterstedt, 1842)

References

Stratiomyidae
Diptera of Africa
Diptera of Asia
Diptera of Australasia
Diptera of Europe
Diptera of South America
Brachycera genera
Taxa named by Kálmán Kertész